This page summarises the Australia national soccer team fixtures and results in 2018.

Summary
Australia participated in the 2018 FIFA World Cup, held in Russia in June and July. The draw took place in Moscow on 1 December 2017, with Australia drawn in Group C alongside France, Peru, and Denmark.

On 25 January 2018, the FFA appointed Bert van Marwijk on a short-term contract for the 2018 FIFA World Cup.

On 8 March 2018 the FFA announced that Graham Arnold would take over the head coach position from van Marwijk at the conclusion of the World Cup and will continue in the role until the 2022 FIFA World Cup.

On 24 March 2018, Australia played their first match under the management of van Marwijk, playing a friendly against Norway at Ullevaal Stadion in Oslo. Van Marwijk reverted from Ange Postecoglou's favoured formation of three-at-the-back to the more traditional four defenders formation, and handed international debuts to Andrew Nabbout, Dimitri Petratos, and Aleksandar Susnjar. Despite going ahead in the 20th minute after a goal by Jackson Irvine, Australia lost the match 4–1. A few days later, Australia drew 0–0 in a friendly match against Colombia at Craven Cottage in London, with Danny Vukovic saving an 86th minute penalty.

More than 2 months later, on 1 June 2018, Australia played the first of two friendlies in preparation for the World Cup. They beat Czech Republic 4–0 at NV Arena in Sankt Pölten, Austria, with Mathew Leckie scoring a brace and Nabbout scoring his first international goal. Six minutes before the end of the game, teenager Daniel Arzani was subbed on, making his international debut. In the second friendly on 9 June 2018, Australia defeated Hungary 2–1 in Budapest, with Arzani scoring his first goal for the national team before both teams scored own goals late in the game.

Australia entered the World Cup ranked 36 in the official FIFA World Rankings. In their first match, Australia lost 2–1 to France with Mile Jedinak scoring the goal for Australia from a penalty kick given after Samuel Umtiti handled the ball in the box. France scored with a penalty by Antoine Griezmann after Uruguayan referee Andrés Cunha consulted VAR and with a deflected shot by Paul Pogba which was confirmed by goal line technology. Arzani was subbed on in the 84th minute and at the age of 19 years and 163 days became the youngest player to ever make a World Cup appearance for Australia. In their second match, Australia drew 1–1 with Denmark with Jedinak scoring the goal for Australia from a penalty kick given after Yussuf Poulsen handled the ball in the box which was confirmed by VAR. Denmark had opened the scoring from a goal by Christian Eriksen. In their third and final match, Australia lost to Peru 2–0, with André Carrillo and Paolo Guerrero scoring from open play.

During their first match under new coach Arnold, and also their first match following the World Cup, Australia beat Kuwait 4–0, leading via an own goal from Khalid El Ebrahim, with Apostolos Giannou and Tom Rogic scoring the second and third goals. Awer Mabil sealed the scoreline, scoring his first senior international goal. The game was also marked by Mabil and Thomas Deng making their senior debuts for Australia, with both South Sudanese refugees growing up together and playing together during their boyhood. Their debuts lead to tributes on social media, led by Patrice Evra.

In the beginning of November, upcoming star Arzani was injured while playing for his club Celtic during a domestic match, rupturing his ACL, most likely ruling him out for the season.

In mid-November Australia played two friendly matches in Australia in preparation for the 2019 AFC Asian Cup, against South Korea and against Lebanon. The match against South Korea ended in a 1–1 draw, with Massimo Luongo equalising in the 94th minute, cancelling-out Hwang Ui-jo's opening goal. The match against Lebanon was a send-off match for Tim Cahill, who played 9 minutes and marked his 108th and final appearance for Australia. Australia won the match 3–0 with Martin Boyle, on his starting debut, scoring twice and assisting Leckie for the third goal. Australia finished the year, beating Oman 5–0 as a final warm-up for the AFC Asian Cup. Chris Ikonomidis and Milos Degenek scored their first international goals, while Nabbout, Mabil, and Irvine also scored.

Australia finished the year ranked 41 on the official FIFA rankings released on 20 December, 5 places lower than in the January rankings.

Record

Match results

Friendlies

World Cup

Player statistics

Correct as of 30 December 2018 (v. ).
Numbers are listed by player's number in World Cup or last friendly played

References

External links
 Australia: Fixtures and Results

Australia national soccer team seasons
2018 national football team results